Smokin' is the fifth studio album by English rock band Humble Pie, released in 1972 through A&M Records. It was the band's international breakthrough, peaking at number 6 on the US Billboard 200 album chart, and hit number 20 in the UK and number 9 in Australia.

Background

The album was Humble Pie's first following the departure of guitarist Peter Frampton, which placed singer and co-founder Steve Marriott as the band's de facto leader. Smokin''' is the band's best-selling album, due in large part to the success of the single "30 Days in the Hole".Smokin includes dramatically slowed down versions of Eddie Cochran's "C'mon Everybody", Junior Walker's "Road Runner", and the wah-wah laden slow blues "I Wonder". "You're So Good for Me", which begins as a delicate acoustic number, ultimately mutates into a full-bore gospel music rave-up, an element that would later influence bands like The Black Crowes.

Alexis Korner guests on the track "Old Time Feelin'", Marriott's vocals take a back seat as the main vocals are provided by Clem Clempson and Korner who also plays a Martin Tiple, mandolin-type guitar. Its sound is reminiscent of the song "Alabama '69" on their first album.

Stephen Stills guests on "Road Runner 'G' Jam" (the title is a nod to the band's habit of developing songs out of jam sessions), by adding his backing vocals that were over-dubbed on "Hot 'n' Nasty" a slow-burning and then dynamic R&B song, after he strolled in after recording his own sessions next door.

Marriott insisted on producing the album himself for the challenge of creating a compact R&B sound with a high-tech 24-track mixing board.  Marriott collapsed with exhaustion in February. The New Musical Express (NME) reported at the time: "Following intense recording sessions with Humble Pie, Steve Marriott collapsed with nervous exhaustion and doctors told him to rest".

With this album the group were seen as leaders of the boogie movement in the early 1970s.

Track listing

Personnel
Humble Pie
Steve Marriott – lead and backing vocals, guitar, harmonica, keyboards
Clem Clempson – guitar, keyboards, backing vocals, lead vocals on "Old Time Feelin'"
Greg Ridley – bass, backing vocals
Jerry Shirley – drums, piano on "You're So Good for Me"GuestsAlexis Korner – vocals, tiple (similar sound to mandolin) on "Old Time Feelin'"
Stephen Stills –  backing vocals on "Hot 'n' Nasty"
Doris Troy – backing vocals "You're So Good for Me"
Madeline Bell – backing vocals "You're So Good for Me"Production'''
Album cover art designed by Kosh
Engineers: Alan O'Duffy, Keith Harwood
Recorded at Olympic Studios, London, February 1972.
Produced by The Pie

Charts

Weekly charts

Year-end charts

Release history
1990 CD A&M
1972 LP A&M
1990 CS A&M
2007 CD Universal
1995 CD Universal/A&M
2007 CD Universal Japan
2017 LP Box Disc 4 A&M ('The A&M Vinyl Boxset 1970–1975', released on 16 June 2017)

References

External links
The History of Humble Pie - Domain for sale
The official Steve Marriott website - 404 Error

1972 albums
Humble Pie (band) albums
Albums produced by Steve Marriott
A&M Records albums
Albums recorded at Olympic Sound Studios